The 2011 JK Racing Asia Series was the first season of the rebranded Formula BMW Pacific Series, which ran for seven seasons in Asia. The championship began on 9 April in Sepang and was scheduled to finish on 30 October in India after eighteen races held at six meetings. However, due to unexpected cancellations, the final meeting was held on 4 December in Sepang.

Nine teams fielded 28 full-time and guest drivers during the tour.

Austrian rookie Lucas Auer, the nephew of Formula 1 driver Gerhard Berger became the 2011 JK Racing Asia Series Driver Champion with 292 points after scoring 17 podium finishes from 18 races with 7 wins. His nearest competitor, Afiq Ikhwan, took 10 wins during the whole season, equalling the record previously set by Jazeman Jaafar, but only managed second overall with 285 points.

Lucas Auer was also crowned the JK Racing Asia Series Rookie of the Year 2011 for finishing the season as the rookie with the most points. After collecting 2 points for taking 2 pole positions in India, Auer made his lead in the rookie standings unassailable, thus deciding the rookie title with 6 races to go. His nearest challenger, Irfan Ilyas from Petronas Mofaz Racing Team managed 135 points from the whole season.

Auer's consistent podium finishes also resulted in his team Eurointernational being crowned the JK Racing Asia Series Team Trophy Winners 2011 with 574 points.

Teams and drivers
 All cars are BMW-engined Mygale FB02 chassis. Guest drivers in italics.

Race calendar and results
The series' provisional schedule was released on 11 February 2011. Latterly, the round scheduled for the Korea International Circuit on 6–8 May was moved to Guangdong on 13–14 August. The Guangdong round was later cancelled due to a typhoon, and was scheduled to be replaced with an additional round at the Buddh International Circuit on 25–27 November. However, the final meet was moved to the Sepang International Circuit after the Buddh International Circuit had to be closed for maintenance work.

Standings
Points were awarded as follows:

Teams' Championship
Points were awarded on the same basis (excluding pole points) as the drivers' championship, but only to a team's first two cars at the end of the race. If a team was running just one car at a meeting, their points were doubled.

References

External links
 Asian Festival Of Speed

JK Racing Asia Series seasons
JK Racing Asia Series season
JK Racing Asia Series season
JK Racing Asia Series